Svartdalshøi is a mountain in Lom Municipality in Innlandet county, Norway. The mountain is surrounded by several other notable mountains including Merrahøi to the west, Vesldalstinden and Holåtindan to the northwest, Steindalshøi and Hestbrepiggene to the northeast, and Steinahøfjellet to the east.

See also
List of mountains of Norway

References

Lom, Norway
Mountains of Innlandet